The Spellenspektakel is the largest board game convention in the Netherlands, featuring game demonstrations, tournaments and other game related activities. It focusses on traditional strategy boardgames, collectible card games, pen-and-paper role-playing games and miniatures wargames. Game publishers participate by showing and demonstrating their new releases to the public. Additionally, the Spellenspektakel hosts numerous game stores and player communities. Visitors can try any game on display and buy the ones they prefer. During the 2019 edition at the Jaarbeurs venue in Utrecht, the Spellenspektakel welcomed over 14,000 people

History 
Established in 1992 as a small wargaming event in Eindhoven, the Spellenspektakel experienced fast-paced growth as part of Dutch game publisher 999 Games. This company invested heavily in the new Magic: The Gathering collectible card game, which dominated the Spellenspektakel in the early years. After the Dutch release of Catan, boardgames enjoyed newfound popularity in the Netherlands which shifted the focus of the convention to board games as well.

In 2007 the Spellenspektakel was sold to Libéma and moved to the IJsselhallen in Zwolle. But after three editions with declining visitor numbers, it was cancelled in 2009. The ownership returned to 999 Games, who didn't initiate any new editions. The Spellenspektakel was acquired by Qdose B.V., subsidiary of Castlefest organiser Vana Events, and moved back to Eindhoven in 2012. As the Eindhoven venue closed down, the Spellenspektakel relocated to the Jaarbeurs in Utrecht in 2019.

References

External links 
 Spellenspektakel website
 Forum by Bordspelmania

Board games
Entertainment events in the Netherlands